Tjahapimu or Tjahepimu, (fl. c.360 BCE) was an ancient Egyptian prince, general and regent during the 30th Dynasty.

Biography
Tjahapimu most likely was a son of pharaoh Nectanebo I and thus a brother of pharaoh Teos, though he is sometimes rather reported as a "brother" of Nectanebo I and an "uncle" of Teos. When Teos went to the Near East leading a military expedition against the Achaemenid Empire, he left Tjahapimu in Egypt as his regent.
However, Tjahapimu took advantage of Teos' unpopularity in Egypt, which was due to the harsh tax regime that the pharaoh imposed in order to finance his expedition. Tjahapimu convinced his own son Nakhthorheb, who was serving Teos as the commander of the machimoi, to rebel against him and to rise as pharaoh himself. His plan was successful: Nakhthorheb (Nectanebo II) was acclaimed pharaoh and Teos fled at Susa to the court of the Great King.

Attestations
For Tjahapimu we have a fine statue made from meta–greywacke which was unearthed at Memphis and is now exhibited at the Metropolitan Museum of Art, New York. On the statue Tjahapimu is called "Brother of the King" and "Father of the King".

References

Thirtieth Dynasty of Egypt
Ancient Egyptian princes
Regents of Egypt
4th-century BC Egyptian people